Sophronica favareli is a species of beetle in the family Cerambycidae. It was described by Maurice Pic in 1944.

References

Sophronica
Beetles described in 1944